St Anthony Monastery may refer to:
Antoniev Monastery, Russia
Monastery of Saint Anthony, Egypt
St Anthony's Monastery, St Anthony, Cornwall
Monastery of St Anthony, Heathcote, Victoria
St. Anthony's Greek Orthodox Monastery (Florence, Arizona)

See also
Hospital Brothers of St. Anthony